Birsa Ambedkar Phule Students' Association (BAPSA) is a student organization formed on 15 November 2014 at Jawaharlal Nehru University on Birsa Munda's birth anniversary. It claims to work for student rights and the issues affecting SCs, STs, OBCs and other minority groups. BAPSA says it stands for assertion, follows Ambedkarite ideology and is critical of both Left- and Right-wing forces on campus. BAPSA is also active in Central University of Gujarat.

Campus activities
Founded by members of the United Dalit Students’ Forum, BAPSA conducts rallies and protests, as well as inviting students and teachers from the campus to talk about their issues.

In 2017, BAPSA blocked the JNU administration building for 20 days in protest at a cut in the number of reserved seats and changes in the entrance criteria for graduate programs which they thought would make it difficult for marginalised applicants to gain admission to study. In February 2018, BAPSA protested the Tata Institute of Social Sciences administration’s decision to withdraw financial aid to students from the Scheduled Caste, Scheduled Tribe and Other Backward Class communities.

JNUSU elections
BAPSA has contested the Jawaharlal Nehru University Students' Union (JNUSU) polls since 2016. The Hindu noted after the 2017 elections, where the BAPSA presidential candidate finished third, that the result showed "there was space for a party that did not subscribe to the Left-Right binary. With every election, the Ambedkarite forces have put up a better show basing their campaign on the 'unity of the oppressed' slogan."

The 2017 elections to the JNUSU Gender Sensitisation Committee Against Sexual Harassment (GSCASH) were won by BAPSA's Magare Bhupali Vithal. The elections were not recognised by the university authorities and were held in protest at the administration's disbandment of the GSCASH.

See also
 Akhil Bharatiya Vidyarthi Parishad
Ambedkar Students' Association

References

External links

Student organisations in India
Student organizations established in 2014
2014 establishments in Delhi
Ambedkarite organisations
Dalit politics